Channa Sachi Muchi (2010) is a Pakistani film in Punjabi language, and it was directed and produced by Ijaz Bajwa.  

According to Bajwa, it is one of the most expensive films ever made in the history of Pakistan, and proclaimed the film as "a revival of Pakistani cinema."  It is the first Pakistani film to incorporate digital intermediate treatment and post-production from Adlab, Mumbai. This movie was  based on a love story from the 1947 Partition of India period. It was a big hit of 2010 Punjabi Cinema, and was released in the Indian province Punjab and Australia.

Plot
Pooja, a Hindu girl, and Bao, a Muslim boy are in love. Bao succeeds in winning Pooja's love. However Sooria, who is Pooja fiancé, is also in love with her. Similarly, Lajo, who is engaged to Bao, is waiting for the love of her life.

Cast
 Moammar Rana
 Saima Noor
 Babar Ali
 Hina Shaheen
 Naghma
 Mehr Hassan
 Shafqat Cheema
 Irfan Khoosat
 Iftikhar Thakur

Music
Music of this flm was by Zulfiqar Ali  with film song lyrics by Khalil-ur-Rehman Qamar. Film songs were sung by Azra Jehan, Naseebo Lal, Harash Deep and Babul Supriyo.

Awards
 The film won the Best Film Of The Year 2010 award on Pakistan Media Award in 2011. 
 Saima Noor won the Best Film Heroine award on Pakistan Media Award in 2011.

References

External links
Channa Sachi Muchi (2010 film) on IMDb website

Punjabi-language Pakistani films
2010 films
2010s Punjabi-language films